The 2021–22 RBL season is the 1st season of the Rwanda Basketball League under its new name. The season began on March 11, 2022 and ended September 19, 2022.

The defending champions REG repeated and won their third league title, after defeating rivals Patriots in the finals.

Foreign players 
The following non-African players played in the RBL in the 2022 season:

Regular season 
The regular season began on March 11 and ended August 14, 2022. The top four teams advanced to the playoffs. The bottom two teams relegate to the Division 2.

Playoffs

Bracket

Semifinals

(1) Patriots vs. (4) Tigers

(2) REG vs. (3) APR

Third place game

Finals: (1) Patriots vs. (2) REG

Awards and statistics

Season awards 

 Most Valuable Player: Axel Mpoyo (REG)
 Team of the Year:
 G Adonis Filer (REG)
 G Kenny Gasana (Patriots)
 F Steven Hagumintwari (Patriots)
 F Axel Mpoyo (REG)
 C Pitchou Kambuy Manga (REG)
 Coach: Henry Mwinuka (REG)

Individual statistical leaders 
After the regular season.

Winning roster
REG BBC
 0 Adonis Filer
 1 Herve Ikishatse
 6 Cleveland Thomas
 7 Pascal Niyonkuru
 10 Olivier Shyaka
 11 Parfait Ishimwe
 13 Elie Kaje
 14 Axel Mpoyo
 20 Kami Kabange
 24 Prince Muhizi
 35 Pitchou Kambuyi Manga
 80 Wilson Nshobozwabyosenumukiza
 HC Henry Mwinuka

All-Star Game 
The all-star game was played on September 24, 2022, in the BK Arena. Team Mpoyo beat Team Steve 126–116 behind 29 points by top scorer Kendall Gray.

References 

2021–22 in African basketball leagues
Basketball in Rwanda